Glyptothrips is a genus of thrips in the family Phlaeothripidae.

Species
 Glyptothrips arkansanus
 Glyptothrips bucca
 Glyptothrips claviger
 Glyptothrips divergens
 Glyptothrips flavescens
 Glyptothrips floridensis
 Glyptothrips fuscipes
 Glyptothrips hylaeus
 Glyptothrips interior
 Glyptothrips longiceps
 Glyptothrips reticulatus
 Glyptothrips saltuarius
 Glyptothrips silvaticus
 Glyptothrips subcalvus

References

Phlaeothripidae
Thrips
Thrips genera